Carlos Alberto Martins Cavalheiro (25 January 1932 – 29 June 2012), better known as Carlos Alberto, was a Brazilian footballer who competed in the 1952 Summer Olympics and in the 1960 Summer Olympics.

References

1932 births
2012 deaths
Association football goalkeepers
Olympic footballers of Brazil
Footballers at the 1952 Summer Olympics
Footballers at the 1960 Summer Olympics
CR Vasco da Gama players
Associação Portuguesa de Desportos players
Footballers from Rio de Janeiro (city)
Brazilian footballers
Medalists at the 1959 Pan American Games
Pan American Games silver medalists for Brazil
Pan American Games medalists in football
Footballers at the 1959 Pan American Games